Rick Brian Blubaugh (born December 28, 1964, Fort Leonard Wood, Missouri) is an American former Professional Soccer Player. He spent four seasons in the Western Soccer Alliance, one in the Major Indoor Soccer League and one in the Continental Indoor Soccer League.

Youth

Blubaugh's roots are traced to Lynnwood, Washington, son of Joe and Selva Blubaugh. In 1981 and 1982, he was a starting Defender for the Boys U- and U- Washington State Select soccer team. In 1981, Blubaugh, along with Washington teammates Geoff Wall and Chance Fry, was tapped to represent the West Region soccer team in a National Tournament held at the United States Olympic Training Center in Colorado Springs, Colorado. The West Region, which also comprised future stars Ralph Black, Rocky Crisp, Karl Groesser, Derek Sanderson, Jeff Duback, Doug Swanson, Dale Ervine, and Paul Caligiuri, reigned supreme winning the Tournament undefeated against the East, South, and Midwest teams. Upon conclusion of the tournament, Blubaugh was selected as an Alternate for the United States Youth National Team.

High school
Blubaugh attended Meadowdale High School in Lynnwood, Washington (1981–1983) where he started three consecutive years as a Midfielder for the erstwhile named Chiefs. He garnered First Team All Western Conference (WesCo) soccer honors (1981-1983) and served as Meadowdale's Team Captain (1982-1983).

College
Blubaugh was a Freshman starting Defender anchoring a talent-laden and nationally ranked San Diego State University Aztecs men’s soccer team, coached by Chuck Clegg (1984–1985). He returned to Seattle, Washington the following year and capped off his collegiate career as a three year starting Defender for the nationally ranked University of Washington Huskies men’s soccer team, coached by Ron Carter (1985–1987). During his tenure at Washington, he was named to the All Northwest Collegiate Conference Team in 1986 (2nd team) and in 1987 (1st team). In his Sophomore and Senior seasons, he was instrumental in leading the Huskies to two Northwest Collegiate Soccer Conference Titles (1985,1987). In 1988, Blubaugh graduated from the University of Washington earning a Bachelor of Arts degree in Psychology.

F.C. Seattle
In the Summer of 1984, as a 19-year-old, Blubaugh assumed duties as a Defender for Football Club Seattle which hosted the F.C. Seattle Challenge. This series featured F.C. Seattle squaring off against three North American Soccer League (NASL) powerhouse teams (Vancouver Whitecaps, Minnesota Strikers, New York Cosmos) as well as the men’s United States Olympic Team. During the Summers of 1986 and 1987, F.C. Seattle entertained Canada's National Team, Manchester City, Dundee F.C., Heart of Midlothian F.C., Norwich City, and Herfolge Boldklub. F.C. Seattle’s roster boasted Select High School, College, and Professional players. The team was coached by former Seattle Sounders luminaries Jimmy Gabriel, Tommy Jenkins, Pepe Fernandez, and Jack Brand and played its games in Seattle’s Memorial Stadium. These contests had a favorable following with the average attendance eclipsing the 6,000 barrier. In 2014, Blubaugh was honored by being named to the F.C. Seattle All-Time starting XI. Also, Blubaugh challenged, guided, and encouraged the development of young minds through soccer with former F.C. Seattle Storm teammates Peter Fewing, John Hamel, Craig Beeson, Eddie Henderson and Jeff Koch spanning the State of Washington at Peter Fewing Soccer Camps (1985–1996).

Western Soccer Alliance
Blubaugh was a starting Defender for the F.C. Seattle Storm (1986–1989), again with former Seattle Sounder Tommy Jenkins at the helm, of the newly minted Western Soccer Alliance. The F.C. Seattle Storm enjoyed a successful campaign overseas in the 1987 and 1988 Great Britain Tours, locking horns with elite English clubs Middlesbrough F.C., A.F.C. Bournemouth, Portsmouth F.C., Queen's Park Rangers F.C., Oldham Athletic A.F.C., Lincoln City F.C., Sunderland F.C., and Hull City A.F.C., not to mention perennial Scottish power, Dundee F.C. 1988 witnessed the Storm secure the top spot in the Western Soccer Alliance regular season standings and, at once, march their way through the playoffs summarily disposing of a star-studded San Jose Earthquakes team in the final 5-0, deservedly crowning them Western Soccer Alliance Champions.

MISL and CISL
The Tacoma Stars of the Major Indoor Soccer League (MISL) selected Blubaugh in the fourth round of the 1988 MISL Draft. He signed with the Stars, coached by former Seattle Sounders icons Alan Hinton and Steve Buttle, and played Defender the 1988-1989 season. In 1995, the Seattle SeaDogs of the Continental Indoor Soccer League (CISL), signed Blubaugh to play Defender for their inaugural season. The SeaDogs were coached by former MISL great Fernando Clavijo and Blubaugh’s former Tacoma Stars teammate Brian Schmetzer.

In the wake of a fruitful career, Blubaugh retired from professional soccer in 1996.

External links
 F.C. Seattle
 F.C. Seattle Storm
 F.C. Seattle Storm
 Tacoma Stars
 Tacoma Stars
 Seattle SeaDogs
 Peter Fewing Soccer Camps
 University of Washington Men's Soccer
 San Diego State University Men's Soccer
 MISL stats

Tacoma Stars players
Seattle Storm (soccer) players
Continental Indoor Soccer League players
Seattle SeaDogs players
1964 births
American soccer players
Indoor soccer players
Major Indoor Soccer League (1978–1992) players
Western Soccer Alliance players
San Diego State Aztecs men's soccer players
Washington Huskies men's soccer players
Soccer players from Washington (state)
Living people
People from Fort Leonard Wood, Missouri
Association football defenders
People from Lynnwood, Washington
Association football midfielders